The 2011 USA Pro Cycling Challenge was the inaugural edition of the USA Pro Cycling Challenge stage race. The race was held from August 22–28, and was rated as a 2.1 event on the UCI America Tour.

Participating teams
Included in the participating team rosters were the top three 2011 Tour de France riders Cadel Evans, Andy Schleck and Fränk Schleck.  The full team list included:

UCI ProTeams
 
 
 
 
 
 
 
 

UCI Professional Continental Teams
 
 
 
 

UCI Continental Teams

Stages

Prologue
August 22, 2011 — Colorado Springs, 

The opening time trial for the race began in the Garden of the Gods national monument and followed a short downhill course that finished in downtown Colorado Springs.

Stage 1
August 23, 2011 — Salida to Crested Butte, 

The first stage of the race saw the riders ascending  over Monarch Pass and ending with a short mountaintop finish up to the resort municipality of Mount Crested Butte.

Stage 2
August 24, 2011 — Gunnison to Aspen, 

Stage 3
August 25, 2011 — Vail, 

The route was the same one used during time trials for the Coors Classic in the 80s. The record for the course, 25:48, was set in the 2008 Teva Mountain Games by Ben Day.

Stage 4
August 26, 2011 — Avon to Steamboat Springs, 

This stage included one sprint point, 99.1 km into the stage.

Stage 5
August 27, 2011 — Steamboat Springs to Breckenridge, 

After the descent, it's a long slow climb through some of Colorado's most popular ski resorts that culminated in a downhill finish into Breckenridge.

Stage 6
August 28, 2011 — Golden to Denver, 

The final stage of the race began under the "Howdy Folks!" sign on Golden's Main Street, as featured in the film American Flyers.  Riders climbed Lookout Mountain, a short but steep climb in the foothills near Golden, and then descended into Denver.  Once in the city, they completed six laps through downtown Denver, finishing on Broadway in front of the state capital building.  The final day of the race was broadcast live on NBC.

Classification leadership

General classification

Notes

External links

USA Pro Cycling Challenge
USA Pro Cycling Challenge
USA Pro Cycling Challenge
USA Pro Cycling Challenge
August 2011 sports events in the United States